Yongmabong is a mountain in Seoul, South Korea. It extends across Guui-dong and Junggok-dong in the district of Gwangjin-gu.

See also
 List of mountains in Seoul
 List of mountains in Korea

Notes

References
 

Mountains of South Korea